The Progress Party (PP) was the ruling party in Ghana during the Second Republic (1969–1972). In the 29 August 1969 elections, the PP won 105 of the National Assembly's 140 seats.

The party was co-founded in 1969 by Kofi Abrefa Busia, who was born as a Bono prince in the traditional kingdom of Wenchi, and by Lawyer Sylvester Kofi Williams, who was born as an Ahanta prince, and a descendant of the Ahanta King Badu Bonsu II.  Kofi Abrefa Busia led the Party, and became the 2nd Prime Minister on 3 September 1969. Sylvester Kofi Williams, served as the ruling Party's Ambassador Extraordinary and Plenipotentiary, in Ghana's 2nd republic, quasi civilian government.

On 13 January 1972, the Progress Party government led by Busia was overthrown through a bloodless military coup led by Colonel Acheampong. The party together with all other political parties were banned.

See also
United Party (Ghana)

References

Defunct political parties in Ghana
Political parties established in 1969
1969 in Ghana
Political parties disestablished in 1972